Hawks House is a historic home located at New Bern, Craven County, North Carolina.  It was built between about 1780 and 1810, and is a -story, six bay by two bay, frame dwelling with a gambrel roof. Between 1807 and 1832, it was the home of Francis Hawks, son of architect John Hawks.  It was moved in the 1970s to 517 New Street.

It was listed on the National Register of Historic Places in 1972.

References

Houses on the National Register of Historic Places in North Carolina
Houses completed in 1810
Houses in New Bern, North Carolina
National Register of Historic Places in Craven County, North Carolina